Crivești may refer to several villages in Romania:

 Crivești, a village in Strunga Commune, Iași County
 Crivești, a village in Vânători Commune, Iași County
 Crivești, a village in Tutova Commune, Vaslui County